Les Minimes, Port de plaisance des Minimes, is the largest marina in France for pleasure boats. It is located in the city of La Rochelle.

Its name is derived from the establishment of a convent of the Frères Minimes ("Order of the Minimes Brothers") in this area during the Middle Ages.

There are slips for about 3,500 boats. The whole area has seen intense urban development, with the construction of many residential buildings.

The marina offers sailing access to the protected Pertuis d'Antioche and its surrounding islands, such as Île de Ré, Île d'Aix and Île d'Oléron.

Buildings and structures in La Rochelle
Transport in Nouvelle-Aquitaine
Tourist attractions in Charente-Maritime